Pavel Rurikovich Kachkayev (born July 22, 1972, Chernigovka, Chishminsky District, Republic of Bashkortostan) is a Russian political figure and deputy of the 6th, 7th, and 8th State Dumas.

In 1994–1995, he was the head of the Leninsky district in Ufa. From 1995 to 2001, he was the first deputy to the head of administration of Ufa. In 2001, Kachkayev was appointed Minister of Housing and Communal Services of Bashkortostan. He left the post in 2003 as he was appointed the head of the administration of Ufa. In 2011, he was elected deputy of the 6th State Duma from the Bashkortostan constituency. He was re-elected in 2016 and 2021 for the 7th and 8th State Dumas respectively.

Awards 
 Order of Friendship
 Russian Federation Presidential Certificate of Honour

References

1951 births
Living people
United Russia politicians
21st-century Russian politicians
Eighth convocation members of the State Duma (Russian Federation)
Seventh convocation members of the State Duma (Russian Federation)
Sixth convocation members of the State Duma (Russian Federation)